The Tamalpa Runners, a Marin County, California based running club, comprises over 700 members of all ages and running abilities.  Tamalpa was founded in 1976 by Kees Tuinzing, Gordon Stewart, and Don Pickett (1968 Dipsea Race winner, aka Mr. Dipsea).

Tamalpa Runners is dedicated to the proposition that not all runners are created equal, but everyone in the club can have a great time running.  The club sponsors competitive racing teams, as well as offering group fun runs primarily on and around Mount Tamalpais.  The club publishes a monthly newsletter, the Tamalpa Gazette, which chronicles club events, coaching tips, and race results.   

Another Tamalpa institution is the Tamalpa Club Racing Series (TCRS), founded in 1983 as a series of low-key cross country running events.  TCRS races are held every month except June (in honor of the Dipsea) and December (in deference to Tamalpa Christmas Party hangovers).  The TCRS courses are a combination of various traditional courses in Marin County selected each year by the club's race directors.

See also
 Dipsea Race

External links
 TamalpaRunners.org

Organizations based in Marin County, California
Road running in the United States
Running clubs in the United States
Sports in Marin County, California
1976 establishments in California
Sports clubs established in 1976
Non-profit organizations based in the San Francisco Bay Area